This is a list of populated places and structures affected by the 2010 Haiti earthquake, a magnitude 7.0 Mw earthquake that occurred on 12 January 2010, with an epicentre approximately  west of Port-au-Prince, Haiti,
and affected an estimated three million people.
The Haitian government estimated that 230,000 people died,
300,000 were injured and 1,000,000 made homeless by the quake.

The earthquake caused extensive damage to infrastructure in southwestern Haiti—in February, Prime Minister Jean-Max Bellerive estimated that 250,000 residences and 30,000 commercial buildings had collapsed or were severely damaged.
The deputy mayor of Léogâne, at the epicentre of the earthquake, reported that 90 percent of buildings in the city were destroyed and Léogâne had "to be totally rebuilt."  As much as 90 percent of Grand-Goâve was devastated, including all public buildings.  In Gressier, 40–50 percent of buildings were destroyed; the same in the worst-affected areas of Carrefour.  Jacmel, the capital of Sud-Est department, also was heavily affected; 70 percent of homes in the city were damaged according to the mayor of Jacmel, as well as the airport, hospital and city hall building.

Many landmark buildings were damaged or destroyed, including the Presidential Palace, the National Assembly building (Palais Législatif), the Supreme Court building (Palais de Justice) and the Holy Trinity and Port-au-Prince Cathedrals.  Port-au-Prince's main port and airport, the Port international de Port-au-Prince and Toussaint Louverture International Airport also suffered severe damage, as did Killick, the Haitian Coast Guard's base in the capital city.  The Ciné Institute, Haiti's only film school, "lost two buildings".

Populated places

Ouest department

Sud-Est department

Structures

See also
 Casualties of the 2010 Haiti earthquake

References

2010 Haiti earthquake
Haiti